A war dance is a dance involving mock combat, usually in reference to tribal warrior societies where such dances were performed as a ritual connected with endemic warfare.  
Martial arts in various cultures can be performed in dance-like settings for various reasons, such as for evoking ferocity in preparation for battle or showing off skill in a more stylized manner. It could also be for celebration of valor and conquest. Many such martial arts incorporate music, especially strong percussive rhythms.

War dances 
Examples of war dances include:

 Aduk-Aduk – Brunei
 Ardah – Arabian Peninsula, Kuwait
 Ayyalah – Arabian Peninsula
 Baris – Bali, Indonesia
 Bende War Dance – Nigeria
 Buza – Russia
Blood walk – Bloods of United States
Cakalele – Maluku, Indonesia
Capoeira, as well as some similar Afro-Caribbean arts
Cibi – Fiji
Crip Walk – Crips of United States
Dirk dance and Scottish sword dances – Scotland
 European sword dance or weapon dance of various kinds
Haka - Māori people of New Zealand
Hako (Rapa Nui) – Easter Island
Hopak – Ukraine
Hula & Kapu Kuialua – Native Hawaiians
Indlamu – Zulu people
Juego de maní – Cuba
Kabasaran – Minahasan people, North Sulawesi, Indonesia
Kailao – Wallis, adopted by Tonga
Khattak – Afghanistan and Pakistan
Khorumi (ხორუმი) – Georgia
Ohafia War Dance – Eastern Nigeria
 Panther Dance – Burmese Bando with swords (dha)
Pentozali – Crete
Pyrrhichios – Greece
Razfah – Oman and the United Arab Emirates
Reggada – Morocco
Sagayan – Philippines
Siva Tau – Samoan war dance
Tahtib – Egypt
Takalo - Niue
Yarkhushta (Յարխուշտա) – Armenia
Yowlah – Oman and the United Arab Emirates

See also

References 

 
Dance
Group dances